Technicolor Federal Credit Union (or Technicolor FCU) is a federally chartered multiple common-bond credit union – a cooperative financial institution that is owned and controlled by its members and operated for the purpose of offering lower rates on loans, lower fees on services and higher returns on savings.  Headquartered in Burbank, California, Technicolor Federal Credit Union is regulated under the authority of the National Credit Union Administration (NCUA), an agency of the U.S. federal government.  This credit union is federally insured by the National Credit Union Administration (NCUA).

Membership 

Technicolor Federal Credit Union is a membership cooperative financial institution, and as such, opening an account requires an individual or business to "join" the credit union.  Once an individual joins, they become a "Member" of the credit union.  

Membership is open to current and retired employees and their immediate families on its "Companies Served" list.  New companies are permitted to request the option to allow their employees and immediate family members to be eligible to join Technicolor Federal Credit Union by submitting a written request to the credit union.`

Services 

Technicolor Federal Credit Union is a full-service financial institution.  As part of the CO-OP network, Technicolor Federal Credit Union provides access to over 30,000 surcharge-free ATMs in the U.S. and Canada.

References 

 Technicolor Federal Credit Union History (2012)
 NCUSIF
 CO-OP Financial Services

External links 
 
 National Credit Union Administration – A government agency

Credit unions based in California
Companies based in Los Angeles
Banks established in 1952
1952 establishments in California